Archeological Site No. 1WI50 is an archaeological site in the Sipsey Wilderness of the William B. Bankhead National Forest in Winston County, Alabama.  It was added to the National Register of Historic Places on December 14, 1985.

Surface remains, believed by archaeologists to be of prehistoric Native American origin, consist of a row of three stone mounds. The mounds are aligned on a north–south axis.

Excavation at the site in 1983 revealed evidence of human occupation during three different cultural periods and covering a time frame spanning from 100 BC to 1000 AD.  More than 2000 artifacts were recovered during the excavation.  These included lithic and ceramic artifacts belonging to the Alexander phase of the Late Gulf Formational period and to the McKelvey phase of the Late Woodland period of Alabama.

References

National Register of Historic Places in Winston County, Alabama
Archaeological sites on the National Register of Historic Places in Alabama
Native American history of Alabama
Former populated places in Alabama
Geography of Winston County, Alabama
Populated places on the National Register of Historic Places in Alabama